Platycythara eurystoma, is an extinct species of sea snail, a marine gastropod mollusk in the family Mangeliidae.

Description

Distribution
This extinct species was found in Pliocene strata of the Bowden Formation, Jamaica.

References

eurystoma
Gastropods described in 1928